The Women's team pursuit competition at the 2021 UCI Track Cycling World Championships was held on 20 and 21 October 2021.

Results

Qualifying
The qualifying was started on 20 October at 13:00. The eight fastest teams advanced to the first round.

First round
First round heats were held as follows:
Heat 1: 6th v 7th fastest
Heat 2: 5th v 8th fastest
Heat 3: 2nd v 3rd fastest
Heat 4: 1st v 4th fastest

The first round was started on 21 October at 18:30. The winners of heats three and four advanced to the gold medal race. The remaining six teams were ranked on time, from which the top two proceeded to the bronze medal race.

 QG = qualified for gold medal final
 QB = qualified for bronze medal final

Finals
The finals were started on 21 October at 20:45.

References

Women's team pursuit